The 1904 Tennessee Volunteers football team represented the University of Tennessee in the 1904 Southern Intercollegiate Athletic Association football season.  The team was led by its fourth new coach in six years, Sax Crawford, who coached the team for a single season. On November 24, Tennessee beat Alabama for the first time in school history. Fullback Sam McAllester wore a belt with handles, and was thrown by teammates for a touchdown.

Schedule

References

Tennessee
Tennessee Volunteers football seasons
Tennessee Volunteers football